Hope Channel Europe is a multilingual Christian TV channel for Europe. It is operated by Stimme der Hoffnung (Voice of Hope) in Germany (which also operates Hope Channel Deutsch), and is owned by the Seventh-day Adventist Church. Programmes are broadcast in English, Romanian, Portuguese, Czech, French, Italian, Norwegian, Russian and Ukrainian. Hope Channel Europe features programming produced by Adventist churches, colleges, hospitals and institutions, covering religious, health, educational and family life topics. Hope Channel Europe is a 24-hour broadcaster on satellite.

Hope Channel Europe is part of the Hope Channel network.

See also 

 Media ministries of the Seventh-day Adventist Church
 Hope Channel

External links 
 

Television stations in Germany
Seventh-day Adventist media
Television channels and stations established in 2007
Christian television networks